Daniel Nicholas Cohen (born 15 January 1974) is a British television executive who currently serves as President of Access Entertainment which invests in film, television and digital companies and content. He was previously the Director of BBC Television from 2013 to 2015. Before that, he was the Controller of BBC One for three years, the BBC's principal television channel in the United Kingdom and the youngest person to be appointed as controller of the channel. During his time at the BBC, he commissioned programmes such as Poldark, Doctor Who, Strictly Come Dancing, EastEnders and The Graham Norton Show, and led BBC One's coverage of the 2012 London Olympics.

Education 
Cohen was born in Westminster, the son of middle-class Jewish intellectuals. He attended a local Jewish primary school in north London, followed by the City of London School, an independent school for boys in the City of London. Cohen read English at Lady Margaret Hall, Oxford, from which he graduated with a Double First in English Literature.

Career

Channel 4 
Between 2000 and 2007, Cohen worked at Channel 4 and its youth service E4. His roles there included Head of Documentaries for Channel 4 and Head of E4.

Cohen's television commissions in this period included Skins, The Inbetweeners, Fonejacker, Supernanny and the documentary strand Cutting Edge.

Controller of BBC Three 
Between May 2007 and October 2010, Cohen was the Controller of BBC Three. During his tenureship of BBC Three, the channel increased its share of 16-34-year-old viewers by 58% and won Digital Channel of the Year at the Edinburgh International TV Festival in two out of three years – 2008 and 2010. His BBC Three commissions included Our War, the BAFTA nominated Blood, Sweat and T-shirts and follow-up series Blood, Sweat and Takeaways, The Undercover Princes, Britain's Missing Top Model, The World's Strictest Parents, The Adult Season, Russell Howard's Good News, Young Voter's Question Time, Stacey Dooley Investigates, Lip Service, Lee Nelson's Well Good Show, Being Human.

Alongside these commissions, he also acquired Summer Heights High from Australia and built a strong following for US animation Family Guy. He also revamped the hourly bulletins 60 Seconds adding a World News update.

In February 2008, The Times newspaper described Cohen as "the boy wonder of British television". In January 2009, the Royal Television Society's magazine Television wrote an article about Cohen which posed the question of whether "the 34-year-old wunderkind" would be Director General of the BBC by his early forties.

Controller of BBC One 
As Controller of BBC One between 2010 and 2013, Cohen's commissions included: Call The Midwife, Happy Valley, Car-Share, Poldark, The Casual Vacancy, The Voice, Last Tango in Halifax, Eat Well For Less, The Missing and the forthcoming Dickensian and War and Peace.

In 2012, BBC One had a record-breaking year with its largest ever growth in peak audience share and its first all-hours audience share growth on record.

Director of BBC Television 
In May 2013, Cohen became Director of BBC Television, succeeding Roger Mosey, who had been temporarily in the post since August 2012.  In this role Cohen oversaw the BBC's Television Networks (BBC One, BBC Two, BBC Three and BBC Four) and BBC Productions – Europe's largest television production group. He also had responsibility for the BBC's feature film unit, BBC Films, and the BBC's content on its digital platform, BBC iPlayer.  In 2014, BBC Television was the most successful UK television network, and in the first quarter of 2015, the BBC's main network, BBC One, delivered its best start to the year in a decade with a prime-time audience share of 25.2%.  

In October 2015, Cohen announced that he was leaving the BBC to pursue a new leadership challenge. On the announcement of his departure, the Director-General of the BBC, Tony Hall, said: "Danny has done an extraordinary job over the last eight years at the BBC. In a world of intense competition and choice, he has further enhanced the BBC's reputation for quality programming that is full of ambition and creativity... and has also made an outstanding contribution to comedy and entertainment".

President of Access Entertainment 
In May 2016, Cohen launched Access Entertainment with the industrialist Len Blavatnik. The company has set out an ambition to be 'one of the world's leading independent investors in the entertainment media sector...with a concentration in high-quality television, films and theatrical productions'. The company aims to invest 'several hundred million dollars in the initial phase'.

Controversies

Jimmy Savile and Pollard report
The Pollard review into Newsnights decision to drop an investigation into sex abuse claims against Jimmy Savile found that Cohen had not read emails that had been copied to him warning of Savile's "dark side" and which indicated there was knowledge within the BBC of the unsavoury side of Savile's character. Had he done so "it was at least possible that further questions [on the advisability of running the Christmas 2011 tributes] would have followed".

Jeremy Clarkson 
The former BBC presenter, Jeremy Clarkson, has been highly critical of Mr Cohen, stating: "Everybody thinks that the BBC was a bloody nightmare. It wasn’t. Cohen was. The BBC was brilliant to work for until the arrival of Mr Cohen. They never really interfered at all. But he was a bloody nuisance and caused me an enormous amount of stress". Clarkson was further aggravated when exploratory talks surfaced between Cohen and Amazon in relation to Amazon Video's movements in Europe. In early 2016, it was said there was a chance Cohen could have become Clarkson's boss on the factual entertainment series The Grand Tour.

Personal life 
Cohen is married to economist and author Noreena Hertz. They were married in 2012 at the Bevis Marks Synagogue in the City of London, in a ceremony conducted by Lord Sacks, the Chief Rabbi, and attended by guests including Rachel Weisz, Nigella Lawson and Charles Saatchi. They live in Primrose Hill, London.

In 2014, in an interview Cohen said that he had "never felt so uncomfortable as a Jew in the UK".

References

External links
 

1974 births
Alumni of Lady Margaret Hall, Oxford
BBC executives
BBC One controllers
BBC Three controllers
Living people
People educated at the City of London School
People from Westminster
British people of German-Jewish descent
English Jewish writers